Fat Music Volume 4: Life in the Fat Lane is the fourth compilation album by the Fat Wreck Chords record label, released in 1999. Its title is a parody of the Eagles song "Life in the Fast Lane".

Track listing
 "May 16" - Lagwagon
 "Road Rash" - Mad Caddies
 "Coming Too Close" - No Use for a Name
 "Pass the Buck" - Sick of It All
 "Twat Called Maurice" - Consumed
 "Promise to Distinction" - Swingin' Utters
 "Heresy, Hypocrisy, and Revenge" - Good Riddance
 "Do You Wanna Fight Me?" - Frenzal Rhomb
 "The Exhumation of Virginia Madison" - Strung Out
 "Taken" - Avail
 "San Dimas High School Football Rules" - The Ataris
 "Old Skool Pig" - Tilt
 "Part Time SF Ecologist" - Goober Patrol
 "The Plan" - NOFX
 "Keep the Beat" - Snuff
 "Dummy Up" - Screeching Weasel
 "Favorite Things" (Oscar Hammerstein II and Richard Rodgers, from The Sound of Music cover) - Me First and the Gimme Gimmes
 "Quadrat im Kreis" - WIZO

See also
 Fat Wreck Chords compilations

References

Fat Music compilations
1999 compilation albums